The Cadillac V16 engine is a term that applies to two different Cadillac-designed V-16 automobile engines, an overhead valve 45-degree  model produced between 1930 and 1937, and a 135-degree side valve  between 1938 and 1940.  Both were used in its most luxurious model line, the Cadillac V-16.

Cadillac produced two of only three production gasoline-fueled V16 engines in history.  The company has twice since attempted to build a new V16 engine, once in the 1980s and again in 2003 (the Cadillac Sixteen), neither making it into production.

Series 452

With its chief competitor, Packard, already having sold a V12 engine against Cadillac's eight-cylinder cars, work began late in the 1920s under Hemmings to produce a car of real impact. Lawrence Fisher, Cadillac General Manager, leaked to the press that the company would also build a V12, hoping to keep the real engine secret.

The original Cadillac V16 could be said to be two overhead valve Buick Straight-8 engine engines on a common crankshaft and crankcase, because each bank operated entirely independently of the other with no other shared components. It sported a narrow 45° bank angle for use in the new Cadillac chassis Cadillac Series 90 V-16 (which became the Fleetwood). The engine was well engineered, with a counterweighted crankshaft (quite a mathematical challenge at the time), overhead valves, and hydraulic tappets. It also had only two single barrel updraft Stromberg carburetors, one for each bank.

In all, 3878 Series 452s were built.

This engine was used in the various V-16 models:
 1930–1934 Series 452 ("A" through "C")
 1935 Series 60
 1936–1937 Series 90

Series 90

The second generation of V16 was known as the Series 90, as was the 1938-1940 Series 90 cars that used them. A sidevalve design, it used an unusually wide vee-angle of 135°, giving a wide but much lower engine to suit the ever-lowering automobile styling. The two carburetors, one on each bank, and air cleaners were mounted on top of the engine block.

The "series 431" 1938-40 Cadillac V16 was one of the last new American auto engine designs prior to World War Two. As such, it incorporated some of the latest thinking. Nine main bearings provided a crankshaft main bearing support between each 135 degree opposing pair of cylinders. The square bore and stroke lowered piston speed and promoted crankshaft rigidity, no small matter for an engine with eight cylinders in line per cylinder bank. The side valve engine design was no handicap for the time because the era's typical top engine speed of 3400-3700 rpm provided little opportunity to exploit the high speed breathing efficiency of the more advanced overhead valve design. Hydraulic valve lifters promoted silent running and an absence of periodic adjustment. Unlike most cars of the era, an external oil filter safeguarded the precision valve lifters. Despite the use of side valves, the engine produced as much power as the prior 45 degree V16, and with much less complexity. The earliest engines produced featured an innovative friction wheel drive to the generator. This was soon replaced by a conventional V belt drive. Cadillac claimed that the 1938, 1939, and 1940 Series 90 Sixteen had the best performance of any production car in the world at the time and would accelerate 10-60 in high gear only in 16 seconds. The definitive engineering report on the 135 degree Cadillac V16 engine is "The Evolution of the Cadillac Sixteen engine," by E.W. Seaholm, in charge of Cadillac engine design. It was published by the industry journal "Automotive Industries," November 27, 1937.

V12

Cadillac also built a Series 452 engine-derived V12 between 1930 and 1937. It was functionally the V-16, less four cylinders. As with the V-16s, Cadillac V-12 cars were designed to make a statement, so all engine wiring and plumbing was hidden from view.

The V12 was used in the Fleetwood-bodied V-12 models:
 1930–1935 Series 370 ("A" through "E")
 1936–1937 Series 80/85

Later developments
The Cadillac Sixteen concept debuted in 2003 utilized an all-aluminium pushrod V16 engine based on the same architecture as GM's then-current small-block V8 developments. A production version with a base V8 and the option of the V12 engine was planned, but was never approved for production and was ultimately shelved around 2008.

References

External links
 "Sixteen-Cylinder Motor Latest Auto Wonder" Popular Mechanics, March 1930

V16
V16 engines